Tripeptide aminopeptidase (tripeptidase, aminotripeptidase, aminoexotripeptidase, lymphopeptidase, imidoendopeptidase, peptidase B, alanine-phenylalanine-proline arylamidase, peptidase T) is an enzyme. This enzyme catalyses the following chemical reaction:

 Release of the N-terminal residue from a tripeptide

This is a zinc enzyme, widely distributed in mammalian tissues.

References

External links 
 

EC 3.4.11